{{DISPLAYTITLE:C20H32O5}}
The molecular formula C20H32O5 (molar mass: 352.465 g/mol) may refer to:
 Levuglandin D2
 Levuglandin E2
 Lipoxin
 Prostacyclin
 Prostaglandin D2
 Prostaglandin E2, an abortifacient
 Prostaglandin H2
 Thromboxane A2